Kailas Balasaheb Ghadge Patil is an Indian politician from Osmanabad, Maharashtra. He is current Member of Legislative Assembly from Osmanabad Vidhan Sabha constituency as a member of Shiv Sena (Uddhav Balasaheb Thackeray).

Positions held
 2017: Elected as member of Osmanabad Zilla Parishad
 2017: Appointed Shiv Sena Osmanabad District President
 2019: Elected to Maharashtra Legislative Assembly

References

External links
  Shivsena Home Page 

Living people
Shiv Sena politicians
People from Osmanabad district
1982 births